"That's When I Reach for My Revolver" is a song by Mission of Burma that was written and sung by band member Clint Conley. It appears on their 1981 EP Signals, Calls and Marches. Moby covered the song in 1996 and released it as a  single, reaching number fifty on the UK Singles Chart. Prior to this, Catherine Wheel also covered the song as a b-side to their single 30 Century Man in 1992.

The title is a reference to the often-mistranslated quotation: "When I hear the word 'culture', that's when I reach for my revolver"—the actual quote from Hanns Johst is "" This translates as: "Whenever I hear [the word] 'culture'... I remove the safety from my Browning!"

Moby version

American musician Moby covered the song in 1996 and released it as the first single from his fourth studio album Animal Rights on August 26, 1996. It reached number 50 on the UK Singles Chart.

The original version of "That's When I Reach for My Revolver" had substantially different lyrics, among which is "Tonight the sky is empty/But that is nothing new/Its dead eyes look upon us/And they tell me we're nothing but slaves." Moby provided an alternate vocal track to permit airplay on MTV; with subdued lyrics, the video version was retitled as "That's When I Realize It's Over".

Track listing 
 CD single 
 "That's When I Reach for My Revolver"  – 3:55
 "Lovesick" – 1:05
 "Displaced" – 1:25
 "Sway" – 6:51

 CD single 
 "That's When I Reach for My Revolver"  – 10:20
 "Every One of My Problems" – 3:14
 "God Moving over the Face of the Waters"  – 5:45
 "Dark" – 4:21

 12-inch single 
 "That's When I Reach for My Revolver"  – 10:20
 "That's When I Reach for My Revolver"  – 10:10

 12-inch single 
 "That's When I Reach for My Revolver"  – 6:52
 "That's When I Reach for My Revolver"  – 6:58
 "That's When I Reach for My Revolver"  – 3:44
 "That's When I Reach for My Revolver"  – 10:20

Charts

Notes 

1981 songs
Mission of Burma songs

1996 singles
Moby songs
Mute Records singles
Music videos directed by Lance Bangs